Antônio Waldez Góes da Silva (born 29 October 1961) is a Brazilian politician affiliated with the Democratic Labour Party (PDT). Since 2023, he has served as Ministry of Integration and Regional Development under President Luiz Inácio Lula da Silva. He formerly served as governor of Amapá between 2015 and 2023 and 2003 to 2010.

References  

Democratic Labour Party (Brazil) politicians
Governors of Amapá
1961 births
Living people
Government ministers of Brazil